Greenwich Town Hall may refer to:
Greenwich Town Hall (Connecticut), USA
Greenwich Town Hall, London, UK

Architectural disambiguation pages